Plaeto is a Dutch rock band, formed in 2002 by ex City-to-City's Sandro van Breemen (vocals and guitar).
 The band is currently signed to NAPF after the release of their debut album All That Scares You. The band's first single, "Being Me," did well in their home country. Plaeto was awarded "most promising band" in 2004 by Dutch radio station 3FM.

Their 2009 follow-up, Breathing New Air, featured quite a different style of music but was popular with fans.

Members

Current members
Sandro van Breemen - lead vocals, lead guitar
Jos Verhijen (2004–present) - bass guitar, backing vocals
Joska Ligtenberg - lead guitar, backing vocals
Jeroen Polderman - drums, percussion, backing vocals

Former members
Erwin Steijlen (2002–2004) - rhythm guitar

Discography

Studio albums

Singles

References

External links
 Official website

Musical groups established in 2002
Musical quartets
Dutch hard rock musical groups
2002 establishments in the Netherlands